Mid Armagh was a constituency in the Parliament of the United Kingdom. It was created by the Redistribution of Seats Act and first used at the 1885 general election. It returned one Member of Parliament (MP) until it was abolished with effect from the 1922 general election.

Boundaries and Boundary Changes
This county constituency comprised the central part of County Armagh. To the north was North Armagh, to the west were South Tyrone and North Monaghan, to the south were South Monaghan and South Armagh and to the east was West Down.

1885–1922: The baronies of Armagh and Tiranny, that part of the barony of Oneilland West not contained within the constituency of North Armagh, that part of the barony of Fews Lower contained within the parishes of Kildarton and Mullaghbrack, the parish of Lisnadill excluding the townlands of Ballymacnab, Cashel, Foley and Seagahan, and the townlands of Corhammock and Edenykennedy in the parish of Kilclooney, that part of the barony of Orior Lower consisting of that part of the parish of Kilmore not contained within the constituency of North Armagh and the townlands of Aughlish, Ballymore, Ballysheil Beg, Ballysheil More, Cargans, Clare, Cloghoge, Coolyhill, Derryallen, Drumnaleg, Druminure, Drumnaglontagh, Lisbane, Lisnakea, Mavemacullen, Monclone, Moodoge, Mullantur, Mullaghglass, Terryhoogan, Tullyhugh and Tullymacann in the parish of Ballymore, and that part of the barony of Fews Upper consisting of the townland of Lisnadill.

Prior to the 1885 United Kingdom general election and from the dissolution of Parliament in 1922 the area was part of the Armagh constituency.

Politics
The constituency was a predominantly Conservative then Unionist area, although not as strongly so as some other parts of Northern Ireland. There were few contested elections and no instance of the same two parties contending against each other more than once.

In 1918 the Unionists defeated Sinn Féin by a solid margin. This was the first contested election for the seat since a 1900 by-election.

The First Dáil
Sinn Féin contested the general election of 1918 on the platform that instead of taking up any seats they won in the United Kingdom Parliament, they would establish a revolutionary assembly in Dublin. In republican theory every MP elected in Ireland was a potential Deputy to this assembly. In practice only the Sinn Féin members accepted the offer.

The revolutionary First Dáil assembled on 21 January 1919 and last met on 10 May 1921. The First Dáil, according to a resolution passed on 10 May 1921, was formally dissolved on the assembling of the Second Dáil. This took place on 16 August 1921.

In 1921 Sinn Féin decided to use the UK authorised elections for the Northern Ireland House of Commons and the House of Commons of Southern Ireland as a poll for the Irish Republic's Second Dáil. Armagh Mid, in republican theory, was incorporated in a four-member Dáil constituency of Armagh.

Members of Parliament 
Constituency created (1885)

Constituency abolished (1922)

Elections

1920s

1910s

1900s

1890s

1880s

 Caused by McKane's death.

See also
 List of UK Parliament Constituencies in Ireland and Northern Ireland
 Redistribution of Seats (Ireland) Act 1918
 List of MPs elected in the 1918 United Kingdom general election
 List of Dáil Éireann constituencies in Ireland (historic)
 Members of the 1st Dáil

References

Who's Who of British Members of Parliament: Volume II 1886-1918, edited by M. Stenton and S. Lees (The Harvester Press 1978)
Who's Who of British Members of Parliament: Volume III 1919-1945, edited by M. Stenton and S. Lees (The Harvester Press 1979)

External links
 https://www.oireachtas.ie/en/members/
 https://web.archive.org/web/20060423011521/http://historical-debates.oireachtas.ie/en.toc.dail.html

Westminster constituencies in County Armagh (historic)
Dáil constituencies in Northern Ireland (historic)
Constituencies of the Parliament of the United Kingdom established in 1885
Constituencies of the Parliament of the United Kingdom disestablished in 1922